The Mahindra Mojo is a touring motorcycle.

Specifications

References

External links
 

Dual-sport motorcycles
Motorcycles of India
Mahindra & Mahindra motorcycles